Tabernacle Cemetery is a historic cemetery located near Greenwood, Greenwood County, South Carolina.  It was established in 1812, and includes the graves of many prominent citizens of Abbeville and Edgefield Districts and later Greenwood County as well, from the early-19th through the 20th centuries. It is the only cemetery in South Carolina where two Confederate Generals, namely brothers-in-law Nathan George Evans and Martin Witherspoon Gary, are buried.  Most graves date from about 1812 to about 1950. The cemetery contains approximately 132 marked graves.

The cemetery was named to the National Register of Historic Places in 2008.

References

External links 
 Tabernacle Cemetery at Find A Grave

1812 establishments in South Carolina
Cemeteries on the National Register of Historic Places in South Carolina
Geography of Greenwood County, South Carolina
National Register of Historic Places in Greenwood County, South Carolina
Buildings and structures in Greenwood, South Carolina